Dichelyne is a genus of nematodes belonging to the family Cucullanidae.

The genus has almost cosmopolitan distribution.

Species:

Dichelyne abbreviatus 
Dichelyne adriaticus 
Dichelyne alatae 
Dichelyne amaruincai 
Dichelyne bodiani 
Dichelyne bonacii 
Dichelyne branchiostegi 
Dichelyne bullocki 
Dichelyne cnidoglanis 
Dichelyne cotylophora 
Dichelyne dichelyneformis 
Dichelyne diplocaecum 
Dichelyne elongatus 
Dichelyne etelidis 
Dichelyne exiguus 
Dichelyne fossor 
Dichelyne fraseri 
Dichelyne jialaris 
Dichelyne kanabus 
Dichelyne laticeps 
Dichelyne leporini 
Dichelyne longispiculata
Dichelyne longispiculus 
Dichelyne lothari 
Dichelyne mariajuliae 
Dichelyne mauritanicus 
Dichelyne micropogonii 
Dichelyne minutus 
Dichelyne moraveci 
Dichelyne pimelodi 
Dichelyne pleuronectidis 
Dichelyne pomadasysi 
Dichelyne rasheedae 
Dichelyne robustus 
Dichelyne rodriguesi 
Dichelyne romani 
Dichelyne sciaenidicola 
Dichelyne sheardi 
Dichelyne spinicaudatus 
Dichelyne szidati 
Dichelyne tornquisti 
Dichelyne travassosi 
Dichelyne tripapillatus

References

Nematodes